Thiotricha clepsidoxa is a moth of the family Gelechiidae. It was described by Edward Meyrick in 1929. It is found in Sri Lanka.

The wingspan is about 7 mm. Both the forewings and hindwings are grey.

References

Moths described in 1929
Thiotricha
Taxa named by Edward Meyrick